Katepensaurus is an extinct genus of rebbachisaurid sauropod dinosaur known from the Late Cretaceous of south-central Chubut Province of central Patagonia, Argentina. It contains a single species, Katepensaurus goicoecheai.

Discovery
 
Katepensaurus was first described and named by Lucio M. Ibiricu, Gabriel A. Casal, Rubén Dario Martínez, Matthew C. Lamanna, Marcelo Luna and Leonardo Salgado in 2013 and the type species is Katepensaurus goicoecheai. It is known solely from the holotype, a partial axial skeleton that includes cervical, dorsal, and caudal vertebrae, found in close association. The holotype, UNPSJB-PV 1007, was collected from the Bajo Barreal Formation, dating to the Cenomanian or Turonian stage of the Late Cretaceous. The generic name is derived from Tehuelche katepenk, "hole", referring to a distinctive opening in the transverse processes of the dorsal vertebrae. The specific name honours Alejandro Goicoechea, the owner of the Estancia Laguna Palacios where the fossil was found.

Description
The dorsal vertebrae of Katepensaurus were found to be unique among other sauropods, exhibiting five autapomorphies, i.e. unique traits. Lateral pneumatic fossa of the centrum (the central part of a vertebra) is divided by internal laminas. On the lateral surface of the vertebrae, overlying the neurocentral junction, vertical ridges or crests are present. A pair of laminae is present in parapophyseal centrodiapophyseal fossa. There are a well-defined, rounded fossae on lateral aspect of postzygapophyses. Finally, transverse processes are perforated by elliptical fenestrae on the vertebrae. Katepensaurus was assigned to Limaysaurinae, a subfamily of rebbachisaurid diplodocoid, based on the presence of traits that were found to diagnose limaysaurines in previous phylogenetic analyses.

References 

Rebbachisaurids
Cenomanian life
Turonian life
Late Cretaceous dinosaurs of South America
Cretaceous Argentina
Fossils of Argentina
Bajo Barreal Formation
Fossil taxa described in 2013
Taxa named by Matt Lamanna